Jungman is a surname. Notable people with the surname include:

Ann Jungman (born 1938), author of children's literature
John George Jungman (1720–1808), Moravian Brethren missionary in North America
Phillip Jungman, American sport shooter

See also
 Jungmann
 Altmann (surname)